Charar-e-Sharief (also spelled Charar-i-Sharief, Charari Sharief, Chrari-Sharif, etc.) is a Sufi Muslim shrine and mosque situated in the town of Charari Sharief in Budgam district of Jammu and Kashmir union territory, India. It is one of the oldest and sacrosanct shrines of Indian Muslims, including Kashmir Valley dedicated to a Kashmiri Sufi saint Nund Rishi. It was built in 1460 to pay homage to Nund Rishi. Masta gul was given a safe passage, but the town was burnt.. It has religious significance in the cultural heritage of Kashmir and is considered the holiest place of Muslims.

It is believed that 9 lakh people gathered at the shrine of charar within two days of his death, in 1438AD. The king Sultan Zain-ul-Abedin also took part in his funeral procession. Besides Muslims, the shrine is also visited by Hindus. After Sufi shrine gutted in fire, it was later reconstructed by the authorities however, local people accused the local government for not taking measures to prevent fire incidents.

History
After the death of Nund Rishi, he was buried in Charar-i- Sharief town where the saint has been laid to rest. Later in 1446, the eighth
sultan of the valley Zain-ul-Abidin, laid the foundation stone of the Charar-e-Sharief shrine at the burial site. Over the time, the shrine was partially damaged. Later, Yakub Shah Chak repaired the damaged parts. In 19th century, an Afghan governor named Atta Mohammad Khan, reconstructed the shrine. The shrine compound was engineered when Bakshi Ghulam Mohammad was serving as the prime minister of the state. In 1979, the Jammu and Kashmir Academy of Art, Culture and Languages installed an epigraphic stone at the mazar (mausoleum) of Nund Rishi.

Desecration
Since the shrine is also used by the Sufi Muslims to offer worships, in 2015, some unknown attackers hurled a grenade on the mosque that subsequently wounded ten devotees. In 2001, unknown attackers carried out a terrorist attack on the women devotees during a Friday prayer that left 4 fatalities with fifty others wounded.

On 11 May 1995, Hizbul Mujahideen militants took shelter inside the shrine that involved Indian security forces and militants in a direct combat. The battle evacuated more than 25,000 people from the encounter site and they took shelter in neighboring villages, "fearing that they would be caught in a battle". Initial reports cited 1,000 houses damaged and another 200 stores destroyed. Indian security forces didn't allow journalists to enter the affected area. The battle left thirty militants dead and fifteen  security personnel were killed during a heavy fire exchange. The gunfight reportedly left a 65-year-old civilian dead.

The BBC falsely reported that the shrine had been stormed by the Indian Army & retracted the claim only after being strongly criticised.

References 

Buildings and structures in Jammu and Kashmir
Religious buildings and structures in Jammu and Kashmir
Sufi shrines in India
Mosques in Jammu and Kashmir
Budgam district